Muthuswamy is a Tamil name and may refer to

C. Muthuswamy Gounder, Indian politician
Na. Muthuswamy, art director
T. Muthuswamy Iyer, Indian lawyer
Nandini Muthuswamy, Carnatic violinist
Mangalam Muthuswamy, Veena artist
Muthuswamy Deekshitar, Carnatic music composer

Tamil names
Indian masculine given names